Koki (晃貴) is a Japanese kickboxer, currently signed with K-1, where he is the former Krush Bantamweight champion.

Kickboxing career
Koki made his professional debut against Shun in September 2015, winning the fight by knockout. He would win his next fight against Tsubasa Hirano as well, by unanimous decision. He suffered his first loss at Krush 72, losing to Akihiro Kaneko by a third-round knockout.

He rebounded with a first round TKO of Reiji Kasami at Khaos 2, This victory was followed by losses to Aoshi and Junya Weerasakreck, as well as a draw with Naoya Otada.

After this bad run of form, Koki won his next three fights against Yuta Kuwata, Taisuke Degai and Shuto Hagiwara, all by decision. He was then scheduled to fight a rematch with Junya Weerasakreck for the Krush Bantamweight title. Koki won the fight by unanimous decision. For his first title defense, Koki faced Junki Sasaki. Sasaki won the fight by unanimous decision.

In his first fight, post title reign, Koki was scheduled to fight Begin Yoshioka. Yoshioka won the fight by unanimous decision. He won his next fight against Toma Kuroda by an extra round decision, before losing to Kazuki Miburo by split decision.

Koki was scheduled to fight a rematch with Akihiro Kaneko at K-1 World GP 2021: Yokohamatsuri on September 20, 2021. He lost the fight by a first-round technical knockout.

Koki was booked to face Takaya Ogura at Krush 135 on March 26, 2022. He won the fight by majority decision, with scores of 28–27, 28–28 and 28–27.

Titles and accomplishments

Professional

 2019 Krush Bantamweight -53kg Champion

Professional kickboxing record

|- style="background:;"
| 2023-03-25|| ||align=left| Ikko|| Krush 147|| Tokyo, Japan ||  ||  ||
|-  style="background:#cfc;"
| 2022-03-26 || Win || align=left| Takaya Ogura || Krush 135 || Tokyo, Japan || Decision (Majority)|| 3 ||3:00 
|-  style="background:#fbb;"
| 2021-09-20 ||Loss||align=left| Akihiro Kaneko || K-1 World GP 2021: Yokohamatsuri || Yokohama, Japan || TKO (Three knockdowns)  || 1 || 2:35
|-  style="background:#cfc;"
| 2021-05-30 || Win || align=left| Yuto Kuroda ||  Krush.125  || Tokyo, Japan || Ext.R Decision (Split)|| 3 || 3:00
|-  style="background:#cfc;"
| 2021-02-27|| Win ||align=left| Aoi Noda || Krush 122 || Tokyo, Japan || TKO (Right Cross) || 2 ||
|- style="background:#fbb;"
| 2020-11-03|| Loss ||align=left| Kazuki Miburo||  K-1 World GP 2020 in Fukuoka || Fukuoka, Japan || Decision (Split)  || 3 ||3:00
|-  style="background:#cfc;"
| 2020-06-28|| Win ||align=left| Toma Kuroda || Krush 115 || Tokyo, Japan || Ext.R Decision (Unanimous) || 4 || 3:00
|-  style="background:#fbb;"
| 2020-03-28|| Loss ||align=left| Begin Yoshioka || Krush.112 || Tokyo, Japan || Decision (Unanimous) || 3 || 3:00
|-  style="background:#FFBBBB;"
| 2019-11-08|| Loss||align=left| Junki Sasaki || Krush.107 || Tokyo, Japan || Decision (Unanimous) || 3 || 3:00
|-
! style=background:white colspan=9 |
|-  style="background:#FFBBBB;"
| 2019-06-30|| Loss ||align=left| Samvel Babayan || K-1 World GP 2019: Super Bantamweight World Tournament, Quarter Finals || Saitama, Japan || Decision (Majority) || 3 || 3:00
|-  style="background:#CCFFCC;"
| 2019-04-19|| Win ||align=left| Junya Weerasakreck || Krush 100 || Tokyo, Japan || Decision (Unanimous) || 3 || 3:00
|-
! style=background:white colspan=9 |
|-  style="background:#CCFFCC;"
| 2019-01-26|| Win ||align=left| Shuto Hagiwara || Krush.97 || Tokyo, Japan || Ext.R Decision (Unanimous) || 4 || 3:00
|-  style="background:#CCFFCC;"
| 2018-09-30|| Win ||align=left| Taisuke Degai || Krush.93 || Tokyo, Japan || Decision (Unanimous) || 3 || 3:00
|-  style="background:#CCFFCC;"
| 2018-06-30|| Win ||align=left| Yuta Kuwata || Krush.89 || Tokyo, Japan || Decision (Majority) || 3 || 3:00
|-  style="background:#FFBBBB;"
| 2018-04-22|| Loss ||align=left| Junya Weerasakreck || Krush.87 || Tokyo, Japan || Decision (Unanimous) || 3 || 3:00
|-  style="background:#c5d2ea;"
| 2018-01-27|| No Contest ||align=left| Naoya Otada || Krush.84 || Tokyo, Japan || Doctor Stoppage || 1 ||
|-  style="background:#FFBBBB;"
| 2017-08-20|| Loss ||align=left| Aoshi || Krush.79 || Nagoya, Japan || KO (Punches) || 2 || 2:01
|-  style="background:#CCFFCC;"
| 2017-05-13|| Win ||align=left| Reiji Kasami || KHAOS.2 || Tokyo, Japan || TKO (Punches)|| 1 || 2:53
|-  style="background:#FFBBBB;"
| 2017-01-15|| Loss ||align=left| Akihiro Kaneko || Krush.72 || Tokyo, Japan || KO (Left Hook) || 3 || 2:00
|-  style="background:#cfc;"
| 2015-12-12|| Win ||align=left| Tsubasa Hirano || J-NEXUS 2015～DAY～ || Tokyo, Japan || Decision (Unanimous) ||3 || 3:00
|-  style="background:#cfc;"
| 2015-09-20|| Win ||align=left| Shun || Japan Kickboxing Innovation || Okayama, Japan || KO || ||  
|-
| colspan=9 | Legend:    

|-  style="background:#cfc;"
| 2015-02-22|| Win ||align=left| Kyosuke Yamazaki || NEXT LEVEL Shikoku 15 || Shikoku, Japan || Decision (Unanimous) || 2 || 2:00
|-  style="background:#fbb;"
| 2014-10-19|| Loss||align=left| Taito Gunji || 2nd K-1 Amateur Challenge 2014, B-class -55kg Tournament Semi Final || Tokyo, Japan || Decision (Majority)|| 1 || 2:00

|-  style="background:#fbb;"
| 2014-07-21|| Loss||align=left| Issei ichiki || 1st K-1 Amateur Challenge 2014, B-class -55kg Tournament Semi Final || Tokyo, Japan || Decision (Unanimous) || 1 || 2:00
|-  style="background:#cfc;"
| 2014-07-21|| Win ||align=left| Takehiko Tanigawa || 1st K-1 Amateur Challenge 2014, B-class -55kg Tournament Quarter Final || Tokyo, Japan || Decision (Unanimous) || 1 || 2:00
|-  style="background:#cfc;"
| 2014-02-23|| Win ||align=left| Yuta Takahashi || NEXT LEVEL Shikoku 12 || Shikoku, Japan || Decision (Unanimous) || 2 || 2:00
|-  style="background:#cfc;"
| 2014-02-02|| Win ||align=left| Yusuke Nakajima || KAKUMEI Kickboxing || Tokyo, Japan || Decision (Unanimous) || 2 || 2:00 
|-
| colspan=9 | Legend:

See also
 List of male kickboxers

References

Living people
1998 births
Japanese male kickboxers
Flyweight kickboxers
Sportspeople from Tottori Prefecture